Spin Optics Laboratory (SOLAB) is named after Igor Nikolaevich Uraltsev and located at the V. A. Fock Institute of Physics of Saint Petersburg State University. It is funded by the megagrant of Russian Federation government. 
Prof. Alexey Kavokin is the head of the Laboratory.

SOLAB studies the spin currents induced by light in semiconductor structures. It deals with exciton polaritons: mixed light-matter quasi-particles, which obey bosonic statistics and can form condensates and coherent fluids. Polariton spin currents are expected to form a basis of a new set of logic devices, where information would be encoded by spin or polarisation. SOLAB is aiming at controlling the polariton spins on a picosecond timescale, which would allow one to encode information and transmit it on a terahertz frequency.

The experimental facilities 

 time- and spatially resolved Faraday and Kerr rotation spectroscopy;
     two-color pump-probe spectroscopy;
     spin noise spectroscopy;
     angular resolved photoluminescence, reflectivity and Raman spectroscopy;
     time-resolved magneto-photoluminescence.

Collaborates 
The Spin Optics laboratory strongly collaborates with the world-leading research centers, including:
 Cavendish Laboratory, Cambridge, (UK)
 Laboratoire de Photonique et Nanostructures, CNRS, Marcoussis, (France)
 Ecole Polytechnique Federal de Lausanne (Switzerland)
 University of California in San Diego (USA)
 University of Heraklion (Greece) 
 University of Dortmund (Germany)
 Ioffe Physical-Technical Institute (Russia)

References

External links 
 SOLAB Spin Optics Laboratory in St.Petersburg State University
 SOLAB Spin Optics Laboratory in St.Petersburg State University (old site)
 MIFP.eu Mediterranean Institute of Fundamental Physics official website

Laboratories in Russia
Saint Petersburg State University